Ōnogi, Onogi, Oonogi or Ohnogi is a Japanese surname. Notable people with the surname include:

, Japanese politician
, Japanese screenwriter and novelist
, Japanese swimmer

Japanese-language surnames